This is a list of notable Somalilanders from Somaliland, as well as the Somaliland diaspora.

Athletes
Mo Farah - British-Somalilander long-distance runner
Bashir Abdi - Belgian-Somalilander long-distance runner
Mohammed Ahmed - Somali-Canadian long-distance runner
Liban Abdi - Somalilander-Norwegian footballer
Mohammed Ahamed - Somalilander-Norwegian footballer

Authors
Hadrawi - songwriter and philosopher
Nadifa Mohamed - Somali-British novelist

Entrepreneurs
Abdirashid Duale - CEO and founder of Dahabshiil
Ismail Ahmed - Executive Chairman and founder of WorldRemit

Journalists
Rageh Omaar - Somalilander-British television news presenter
Ahmed Said Egeh - former BBC Somali correspondent of Hargeisa

Military
General Nuh Ismail Tani - current Chief of Staff of Somaliland Armed Forces
General Mohamed Adan Saqadhi  - former Commissioner of Somaliland Police Force 
Mohamed Adan Saqadhi - current Commissioner of Somaliland Police Force

Politicians
Muse Bihi Abdi - current President of Somaliland
Mohamoud Hashi Abdi

Scientists
Jama Musse Jama - Ethnomathematician and writer

See also

List of Somalis
List of Somaliland politicians

References